Nercely Desirée Soto Soto (born 23 August 1990 in Caja Seca, Zulia) is a Venezuelan sprinter. At the 2012 Summer Olympics and the 2016 Summer Olympics in Rio, she competed in the Women's 200 metres. In the Rio Summer Olympics she was seventh in Semifinal 3.

Personal bests
100 m: 11.49 (wind: +0.7 m/s) –  Santiago de Chile, 8 April 2016
200 m: 22.53 (wind: +0.1 m/s) –  Caracas, 12 May 2012
400 m: 51.94 A  –  Trujillo, 26 November 2013

International competitions

1: Did not finish in the final.
2: Disqualified in the semifinals.

References

External links

Sports reference biography

1990 births
Living people
Venezuelan female sprinters
Olympic athletes of Venezuela
Athletes (track and field) at the 2012 Summer Olympics
Athletes (track and field) at the 2016 Summer Olympics
Pan American Games competitors for Venezuela
Athletes (track and field) at the 2015 Pan American Games
Athletes (track and field) at the 2019 Pan American Games
World Athletics Championships athletes for Venezuela
Athletes (track and field) at the 2018 South American Games
South American Games gold medalists for Venezuela
South American Games silver medalists for Venezuela
South American Games bronze medalists for Venezuela
South American Games medalists in athletics
Central American and Caribbean Games gold medalists for Venezuela
Competitors at the 2014 Central American and Caribbean Games
Competitors at the 2018 Central American and Caribbean Games
Central American and Caribbean Games medalists in athletics
South American Games gold medalists in athletics
Olympic female sprinters
People from Zulia
21st-century Venezuelan women